Chao Ji, Chaoji, or, variant, may refer to:

People and characters

Given name "Chao-ji"
 Tay Teow Kiat (born 1947), Chinese Singaporean musician

Characters
 Chaoji Han (チャオジー・ハン), a fictional character from D-gray Man

Given name "Chao" surname "Ji"
 Ji Chao (纪超; born 1991), Chinese soccer player

Standards
 ChaoJi, an electric car charging standard for East Asia, developed in China and Japan to replace GB/T and CHAdeMO respectively
 Chaoji (超级), a variant of VCD and Super Video CD
 "Chao ji", a type of token currency once used in China; see Chinese token (alternative currency)

Other uses
 Chaoji, the dawn sacrifice in Manchu shamanism

See also

 
 
 Chao (disambiguation)
 Ji (disambiguation)